Sawtooth Range, Sawtooth Ridge, and Sawtooth Mountains may refer to:

Sawtooth Range (Alaska) in Alaska, United States
Sawtooth Range (San Bernardino County) in California, United States
Sawtooth Range (San Diego County) in California, United States
Sawtooth Range (Colorado) in Colorado, United States
Sawtooth Range (Idaho) in Idaho, United States
Sawtooth Range (Montana) in Montana, United States
Sawtooth Range (British Columbia) in the Monashee Mountains of British Columbia, Canada
Sawtooth Range (Nunavut) in Nunavut, Canada
Sawtooth Ridge (California, Hoover Wilderness), on the Sierra Crest
Sawtooth Ridge (California, Tahoe National Forest), in the Lake Tahoe Basin
Sawtooth Ridge, Montana, United States
Sawtooth Mountains (Arizona) in Arizona, United States
Sawtooth Mountains (California) in eastern San Diego County, California, United States
Sawtooth Mountain (Colorado) in Colorado, United States
Sawtooth Mountains (Minnesota) in Minnesota, United States
Sawtooth Mountain (Utah) in Utah, United States

Sawtooth Peak may refer to summits such as:
Sawtooth Peak (California, Sierra topographic front), on the Sierra Crest
Sawtooth Peak (California, Sequoia National Park), in the Mineral King region